Shawinigan is a city located on the Saint-Maurice River in the Mauricie area in Quebec, Canada.

Shawinigan may also refer to:

Places
 Shawinigan River, a tributary of the Saint-Maurice River, Quebec, Canada
 Shawinigan (Province of Canada), a former electoral division of the Province of Canada from 1854 to 1867 for the Mauricie area in Quebec
 Division of Shawinigan (Legislative Council), a former electoral division of the Legislative Council of Quebec from 1867 to 1968

Other uses
 Collège Shawinigan, a junior college in Shawinigan, Quebec, Canada
 , a Flower class corvette that served in the Royal Canadian Navy and was lost during the Battle of the Atlantic in World War II
 , a Kingston class patrol vessel in the Canadian Forces, commissioned in 1997

See also 
 Shawinigan Handshake, an epithet given to a chokehold executed in 1996 by Jean Chrétien, then Prime Minister of Canada, on an anti-poverty protester
 Shawinigan Water & Power Company, a former hydroelectric companies in Canada, now part of Hydro-Québec
 Shawnigan Lake, British Columbia, a village on Vancouver Island